Nadège is a French feminine given name.

List of people with the given name 

 Nadège Lacroix (born 1986), Swiss actress, television personality.
 Nadège August, American actress, producer, and podcast host
 Nadège Vanhee-Cybulski, French fashion designer
 Nadège du Bospertus, French model
 Nadège Koffi (born 1989), Ivorian former footballer
 Nadège Bobillier (born 1988), French skater
 Nadège Douroux (born 1981), French yacht racer
 Nadège Beausson-Diagne (born 1972), French actress, singer and columnist
 Nadege Uwamwezi (born 1993), Rwandan actress
 Nadège Cliton (born 1978), French former medley swimmer
 Nadège Cissé (born 1997), Ivorian professional footballer
 Nadège Abomangoli (born 1975), Congo-born French politician
 Nadege Essoh (born 1990), Ivorian professional footballer
 Nadège Noële Ango-Obiang (born 1973), Gabonese writer

See also 

 Nadezhda (disambiguation)
 Nadia (Nadiia, Nadiya, Nadja, Nadya)
 Nadine (given name)
 Nadine (disambiguation)

Given names
Feminine given names
French feminine given names